KTSM-TV (channel 9) is a television station in El Paso, Texas, United States, affiliated with NBC and owned by Nexstar Media Group. The station's studios are located on Oregon Street (near El Paso Community College) in northwest El Paso, and its transmitter is located atop the Franklin Mountains on the El Paso city limits.

History

Early years

The station first signed on the air on January 4, 1953. KTSM-TV was the second television station in the El Paso TV market, behind KROD-TV (channel 4, now KDBC-TV), which debuted in December 1952. KTSM-TV was owned by Tri-State Broadcasting, a nod to the U.S. states of Texas and New Mexico and the Mexican state of Chihuahua. Channel 9 was co-owned with KTSM radio (then on 1380 AM, now at 690 AM) and 99.9 KTSM-FM. (The two radio stations are both now owned by iHeartMedia.)

The call sign stood for the company's original name, "Tri-State Music." The meaning has since changed to Tri-State Media.

Key figures
Tri-State Broadcasting was controlled by El Paso broadcast pioneer Karl O. Wyler (1906-1990), who signed on KTSM (AM) in 1930.  Wyler built the El Paso Aerial Tramway in the early 1960s to allow his staff to maintain the transmitters at Ranger Peak. The tramway was open to the public until the 1980s, when insurance laws in Texas became too costly for carrying people who were not employees. Wyler owned the station until his death in 1990, and donated his controlling stake in Tri-State Broadcasting to the El Paso Community Foundation. In 1991, the Foundation hired Richard E. Pearson, who served as station manager at ABC affiliate KVIA-TV (channel 7) at the time, to run the operations of the radio and television stations. Under Pearson's leadership, KTSM-TV flourished, and became a dominant force in the market, until the stations were sold to Communications Corporation of America in 1998.

Among KTSM-TV's most famous personalities was Ted Bender (1925–2013), who hosted numerous shows on the station including the local version of the Dialing for Dollars, which aired weekdays at 10:05 a.m., following a five-minute mid-morning newscast at 10:00 a.m. Bender gave four viewers a chance to win money while watching the station. Halfway through the calls, Bender (who was a city councilman) would interview a key figure in the El Paso community.  Bender also served as KTSM-TV's lead weather forecaster, from the station's inception until his retirement in 1991.

Agreement with KDBC-TV
On October 19, 2009, Communications Corporation of America entered into a shared services agreement (SSA) with Titan Broadcast Management, owner of CBS affiliate KDBC-TV. KTSM-TV provided advertising sales and administrative services as well as some news resources for Channel 4. Titan retained KDBC-TV's license and both stations employed separate news departments. On April 24, 2013, ComCorp announced that it would sell all of its television stations, including KTSM-TV, to the Nexstar Broadcasting Group. The sale was completed on January 1, 2015.

The acquisition, as well as the sale of KDBC-TV to the Sinclair Broadcast Group (which originally planned to transfer that station's license to partner company Cunningham Broadcasting), placed some uncertainty on the future status of the SSA between KTSM-TV and KDBC-TV, particularly as Channel 4 is now co-owned with Fox affiliate KFOX-TV (channel 14). The SSA was indeed terminated on October 16, 2014, at which point KDBC-TV began producing its newscasts in association with KFOX-TV.

Programming
KTSM-TV clears most of the NBC network schedule. However, the station preempted the CNBC program Mad Money which formerly aired as part of the network's overnight block (although it cleared the rebroadcast of the fourth hour of Today which preceded it nationally). The station aired infomercials in place of Mad Money.

Syndicated programs broadcast by KTSM-TV include Rachael Ray, Karamo, Dr. Phil, and TMZ.

For many years, the station delayed the airing of NBC's daytime game shows which later were seen in the afternoon hours. Instead, KTSM-TV showed Dialing for Dollars and daytime soaps. The NET/PBS shows Sesame Street and Mister Rogers' Neighborhood were also broadcast due to the lack of a full-market public television station in the area at the time. Las Cruces–based KRWG-TV (channel 22) was an NET/PBS member, but its reception was spotty in parts of the El Paso TV market due to the Franklin Mountains cutting across western El Paso. NET/PBS arranged for channel 9 to carry select children's programs including Sesame Street. Sesame Street aired on the station from its debut in 1969 until El Paso PBS station KCOS signed on in August 1978. Before KRWG-TV signed on the air in 1973, KTSM aired a number of additional programs from NET/PBS.

News operation
KTSM-TV presently broadcasts 24½ hours of locally produced newscasts each week (with 4½ hours on weekdays and one hour each on Saturdays and Sundays). On August 3, 2008, starting with its 5:00 p.m. newscast, KTSM became the first television station in the El Paso market to begin broadcasting its local newscast in high definition.

In 2019, KTSM-TV reporter joined Nexstar-owned website Border Report as an El Paso correspondent.

Notable former on-air staff
 Micah Johnson
 Ben Swann

Technical information

Subchannels
The station's digital signal is multiplexed:

KTSM began to carry the Spanish-language network Estrella TV on its second digital subchannel in 2009.

Analog-to-digital conversion
KTSM-TV shut down its analog signal, over VHF channel 9, at 12:30 p.m. on June 12, 2009, the official date on which full-power television stations in the United States transitioned from analog to digital broadcasts under federal mandate. The station's digital signal relocated from its pre-transition UHF channel 16 to VHF channel 9.

Due to reports of reception issues with its signal on digital channel 9, KTSM-TV was granted permission by the Federal Communications Commission to operate a secondary signal on its former UHF digital channel 16 under special temporary authorization on July 23, 2009, mapped to virtual channel 9.1. KTSM had filed a petition to the FCC to permanently operate its digital signal exclusively on UHF channel 16.  It was issued a license for that channel on June 5, 2015.

References

External links
 

NBC network affiliates
Estrella TV affiliates
Ion Mystery affiliates
Laff (TV network) affiliates
Television channels and stations established in 1953
TSM-TV
1953 establishments in Texas
Nexstar Media Group